The 1972 Cronulla-Sutherland Sharks season was the sixth in the club's history. They competed in the NSWRFL's 1972 premiership.

Ladder

References

Cronulla-Sutherland Sharks seasons
Cronulla-Sutherland Sharks season